The Public Franchise League was "a small informal group of high-minded citizens formed by Boston lawyer Louis D. Brandeis and Boston merchant Edward A. Filene."

Its secretary from 1906 to 1913 was Joseph Bartlett Eastman.

Louis Brandeis